The 1963 Prime Minister's Resignation Honours were officially announced in the London Gazette of 22 October 1963 and marked the resignation of the Prime Minister, Harold Macmillan.

Hereditary titles

Barons
The Honourable John Edward Reginald Wyndham, MBE

Baronetcies
Samuel Knox Cunningham, Esq., Q.C., M.P.
Sidney Harold Evans, Esq., C.M.G., O.B.E.
Sir John Samuel Richardson, M.V.O., M.D.,F.R.C.P.

Knights Bachelor
Philip Francis de Zulueta, Esq.

Order of the British Empire

Knights Commander (KBE)
Timothy James Bligh, Esq., D.S.O., O.B.E., D.S.C.

Commanders (CBE)
Philip John Woodfield, Esq.

Officers (OBE)
Mrs Ethele Harding.
Mrs Mabel Maltby.
Miss Joan Summers.

Members (MBE)
Sidney Alfred May, Esq.

British Empire Medal (BEM)
Miss Edith Baker.
Mrs Sarah Bell.
Inspector William Harwood, Metropolitan Police.
William Housden

References

1963 awards
October 1963 events in the United Kingdom
Prime Minister's Resignation Honours
1963 in British politics
Harold Macmillan